SS Macclesfield was a cargo vessel built for the Great Central Railway in 1914.

History

The ship was built by Swan Hunter and launched on 22 May 1914 by Miss Fay, daughter of Sir Sam Fay, general manager of the Great Central Railway.  She was the second of an order of two ships from Swan Hunter, the other being . She was deployed on the Grimsby to Rotterdam service.

In 1923 she passed into the ownership of the London and North Eastern Railway and in 1935 to Associated Humber Lines. In 1948 she was in the ownership of British Railways and scrapped in 1958 in Utrecht.

References

1914 ships
Steamships of the United Kingdom
Ships built on the River Tyne
Ships of the Great Central Railway
Ships of the London and North Eastern Railway
Ships of Associated Humber Lines
Ships of British Rail